Damani Horton (born 28 October 1979) is a Bahamian international soccer player, who plays as a defender for the Bahamas national team.

International career
He made his international debut for Bahamas in a March 2004 FIFA World Cup qualification match against Dominica and has earned a total of 3 caps, scoring 1 goal. He won all of his caps in World Cup qualification matches.

International Goals
Scores and results list the Bahamas' goal tally first.

Personal life
Horton studied in Canada and England and is an associate in a Bahamian law firm, specializing in Civil and Commercial Litigation.

References

External links

 

1979 births
Living people
Sportspeople from Nassau, Bahamas
Association football defenders
Bahamian footballers
Bahamas international footballers
21st-century Bahamian lawyers